Robert Cheyne (born 20 October 1976) is a New Zealand former professional tennis player.

Cheyne grew up in Tītahi Bay and was a collegiate player for Fresno State, before competing professionally. He won two ITF Futures doubles titles, both with Mark Nielsen. In 2003 he represented the New Zealand Davis Cup team in ties against Pakistan and India. Soon after he left the tour to become an assistant coach for Baylor University and helped guide the team to an NCAA championship in 2004. He is now back in New Zealand, working as a chiropractor.

ITF Futures finals

Doubles: 3 (2–1)

See also
List of New Zealand Davis Cup team representatives

References

External links
 
 
 

1976 births
Living people
New Zealand male tennis players
Fresno State Bulldogs men's tennis players
Sportspeople from Porirua